The neon-burning process is a set of nuclear fusion reactions that take place in evolved massive stars with at least 8 Solar masses. Neon burning requires high temperatures and densities (around 1.2×109 K or 100 keV and 4×109 kg/m3).

At such high temperatures photodisintegration becomes a significant effect, so some neon nuclei decompose, releasing alpha particles:

:{| border="0"
|- style="height:2em;"
| ||+ ||γ ||→ || ||+ ||
|- style="height:2em;"
| ||+ || ||→ || ||+ ||γ
|}

Alternatively:
:{| border="0"
|- style="height:2em;"
| ||+ ||n ||→ || ||+ ||γ
|- style="height:2em;"
| ||+ || ||→ || ||+ ||n
|}

where the neutron consumed in the first step is regenerated in the second.

Neon burning takes place after carbon burning has consumed all carbon in the core and built up a new oxygen–neon–sodium–magnesium core. The core ceases producing fusion energy and contracts. This contraction increases density and temperature up to the ignition point of neon burning. The increased temperature around the core allows carbon to burn in a shell, and there will be shells burning helium and hydrogen outside.

During neon burning, oxygen and magnesium accumulate in the central core while neon is consumed. After a few years the star consumes all its neon and the core ceases producing fusion energy and contracts. Again, gravitational pressure takes over and compresses the central core, increasing its density and temperature until the oxygen-burning process can start.

References

External links
 Arnett, W. D. Advanced evolution of massive stars. V – Neon burning / Astrophysical Journal, vol. 193, Oct. 1, 1974, pt. 1, p. 169–176.

Nucleosynthesis